I Sayd I Look Away! is a single CD by the Italian singer-songwriter Perseo Miranda.

It contains 1 track and it was released in 1981 on the Lodger Records label.

Track listing
"I sayd I look Away!"

References

External links
 Perseo Miranda official website
 Perseo Miranda official Myspace site

1981 albums
Perseo Miranda albums